Dennis Hill (born 16 August 1929) is an English former professional footballer who played in the Football League for Birmingham City.

Playing career
Hill was born in Willenhall, Staffordshire. He joined Birmingham City in June 1951, and made his debut in the Second Division on 13 February 1954, deputising for regular outside left Alex Govan in a home game against West Ham United which Birmingham won 2–0. Hill played only three more games over the next three years, as Govan's goalscoring ability kept him out of first-team consideration, and in February 1957 he decided to pursue a career as a draughtsman while playing part-time football, first with Burton Albion and then with Matlock Town. He scored seven goals from 38 appearances  for Matlock in the 1959–60 season, when the team won the championship of the Central Alliance Division North and reached the First Round Proper of the FA Cup for the first time in the club's history.

References

1929 births
Living people
People from Willenhall
English footballers
Association football wingers
Darlaston Town F.C. players
Birmingham City F.C. players
Burton Albion F.C. players
Matlock Town F.C. players
English Football League players